Alexander Robert Frost (born February 17, 1987) is an American actor best known for his roles in Elephant and Drillbit Taylor.

Early life 
Frost was born in Portland, Oregon. He attended high school at the Arts & Communication Magnet Academy, in Beaverton, Oregon.

Career
He had a starring role in Gus Van Sant's film Elephant, in which he played a high school student who commits a school shooting. Since Elephant, Frost has worked on a number of films, including The Queen of Cactus Cove, The Lost and The Standard. He appeared in a Season 3 episode of NCIS entitled "Ravenous". He played the primary antagonist in the Owen Wilson movie Drillbit Taylor, released on March 21, 2008, by Paramount Pictures.  He appeared in two films in 2009, Calvin Marshall and The Vicious Kind.  He appeared in The Wheeler Boys, premiered in the 2010 LA Film Festival.

Personal life
Frost lives in Los Angeles.

Filmography

Film

Television

References

External links 

Living people
American male film actors
Male actors from Portland, Oregon
American expatriates in England
21st-century American actors
1987 births